Tighearnach mac Cathmogha (died 822) was King of Uí Fiachrach Aidhne.

References

 Irish Kings and High-Kings, Francis John Byrne (2001), Dublin: Four Courts Press, 
 CELT: Corpus of Electronic Texts at University College Cork

People from County Galway
9th-century Irish monarchs
822 deaths
Year of birth unknown